Duchess of Nericia or Duchess of Närke may refer to:
 Princess Maria, Duchess of Nericia 1579–1589 (also of Södermanland and Värmland), as the consort of Prince Carl (later King Carl IX of Sweden) 
 Princess Christina, Duchess of Nericia 1592–1604 (also of Södermanland and Värmland), then Queen consort of King Carl IX of Sweden